Cratena tema is a species of sea slug, an aeolid nudibranch, a marine gastropod mollusc in the family Facelinidae.

Distribution
This species was described from Ghana.

References

Endemic fauna of Ghana
Facelinidae
Gastropods described in 2015